Charley's Web is an Australian film shot in 1984 about a man who dreams of being Prime Minister.

References

External links

Australian television films
1980s English-language films
1986 films
1986 television films
1980s Australian films